Chorenta is a genus of beetles in the family Cerambycidae, containing the following species:

 Chorenta biramiguelus (Santos-Silva, 2004)
 Chorenta espiritosantensis (Seabra, 1941)
 Chorenta leonardi Audureau & Demez, 2013
 Chorenta reticulatus (Dalman in Schoenherr, 1817)
 Chorenta toulgeoti Dalens, Touroult & Tavakilian, 2010

References

Prioninae